DatPiff is an online audio distribution platform that was launched in 2005. It is headquartered in Pennsylvania. It specializes in hip-hop, rap, and urban music. The site was founded in the spring of 2005 by Marcus Frasier. It is owned by MediaLab AI Inc..

Features
A key feature of DatPiff is that unregistered users are allowed to download any mixtape uploaded to the site that has been Sponsored - i.e. funded by the artist or label free of charge. Registered users are permitted a limited number of downloads of non-sponsored mixtapes per day. Premium paid users have an unlimited number of downloads of any mixtape. Mixtapes may be streamed by any user. Premium content may also be purchased.

Users can register as either an artist or fan - the key difference being that artists upload their work to the site while fans may only listen to these works.

DatPiff has mobile applications for iOS (iPhone and iPad), Android, Windows Phone 7, BlackBerry, and WebOS.

References

External links

Internet properties established in 2005
American music websites
Free music download websites